A hand dryer is an electric machine which might make use of a heating element and an air blower to dry the hands after hand washing. It is commonly used in public toilets as a cost-effective alternative to paper towels. 

It may either operate with the push of a button or automatically using a sensor.

History
The earliest hand dryer was patented on June 13, 1922 by R.B. Hibbard, D. J. Watrous and J.G. Bassett as a "Dryer Machine" for the Airdry Corporation of Groton New York.  This machine was sold as a built in model or freestanding floor unit that consisted of an inverted blower (much like a handheld blow dryer) that was controlled by a floor pedal. Known as "Airdry The Electric Towel", these units were used in restrooms, barbershops and factories. Airdry Corporation moved to Chicago and San Francisco in 1924 to centralize their distribution.

The hand dryer was later popularized in 1948 by George Clemens, who founded World Dryer and invented the Model A, World Dryer’s flagship model.   In 1993, Mitsubishi Electric introduced a new type of hand dryer "Jet Towel"(:ja:ジェットタオル) that blows jets of air on both sides of the hand, pushing the water off rather than evaporating it.

Costs 
Hand dryers have been popular with industries for their apparent economies. According to manufacturers, hand dryers can cut costs by as much as 99.5% (for example a company may spend $2340.00 per year on paper towels, where as the hand dryer expenditure would be as low as $14.00 per year - this will vary according to the cost of paper towels and electricity). They require very little maintenance compared to paper towels, which must be replaced. An added benefit is the removal of the paper waste. Hand dryers represent a larger initial investment, so those responsible for facility management must do a careful cost analysis to determine whether they are cost effective in their building. Costs are always relative to the kWh cost that the facility is charged by its provider. In the UK, this will typically be around 10-12p, the only way to compare costs accurately is to work out the rated energy consumption and divide it by the number of drys the hand dryer is capable of performing back to back in 1 hour, this will give the energy consumption per dry. The world's lowest energy hand dryer uses just 1 watt-hour per dry and is rated at 0.24 kW.

Effect on environment 
Due to the reduction in litter and waste in comparison with paper towels, which cannot be recycled, hand dryers are claimed to be better for the environment. By eliminating the need for paper towels, hand dryer manufacturers estimate that over 5 billion paper towels from over 200,000 trees per year can be saved. Another study shows that whereas the majority of the environmental impact of a hand dryer occurs during its use, the environmental impact of paper towels is predominantly in the material production and manufacturing stages. It is estimated that hand dryers use 5% less energy than paper towels in the first year, and 20% less over five years. A World Dryer study of 102 hand dryers installed in public schools in Topeka, Kansas, claimed an annual savings of 34.5 tons of solid waste, 690,000 gallons of water, and 587 trees; another World Dryer study of 153 hand dryers in the Iowa state capitol showed an annual savings of 10.5 tons of solid waste and 176 trees. However, a Dutch study published in March 1995 indicated that there was environmental parity between hand dryers and paper towels as hand drying methods when all factors were taken into consideration.

Hygiene and health 

The World Health Organization (WHO) and the Centers for Disease Control and Prevention both stress the importance of frequent and thorough hand washing followed by their complete drying as a means to stop the spread of bacteria. Bacteria transmit more easily from wet skin than from dry skin. WHO recommends that everyone “frequently clean [their] hands…” and “dry [them] thoroughly by using paper towels or a warm air dryer.” The Centers for Disease Control and Prevention report that, “Both [clean towels or air hand dryers] are effective ways to dry hands.” 

A study in 2020 found that hand dryers and paper towels were both found to be equally hygienic hand-drying solutions.

Other research suggests paper towels are much more hygienic than the electric hand dryers found in many public toilets. A review in 2012 concluded that "From a hygiene standpoint, paper towels are superior to air dryers; therefore, paper towels should be recommended for use in locations in which hygiene is paramount, such as hospitals and clinics."

In 2008, a study was conducted by the University of Westminster, London, and sponsored by the paper-towel industry the European Tissue Symposium, to compare the levels of hygiene offered by paper towels, warm-air hand dryers and the more modern jet-air hand dryers. The key findings were:
After washing and drying hands with the warm-air dryer, the total number of bacteria was found to increase on average on the finger pads by 194% and on the palms by 254%.
Drying with the jet-air dryer resulted in an increase on average of the total number of bacteria on the finger pads by 42% and on the palms by 15%.
After washing and drying hands with a paper towel, the total number of bacteria was reduced on average on the finger pads by up to 76% and on the palms by up to 77%.

The scientists also carried out tests to establish whether there was the potential for cross contamination of other public toilet users and the public toilet environment as a result of each type of drying method. They found that:
Use of a warm-air hand dryer spread micro-organisms up to 0.25 metres from the dryer.
Paper towels showed no significant spread of micro-organisms.

In a study conducted by TÜV Produkt und Umwelt GmBH from May 2004 - February 2005, different hand drying methods were evaluated. The following changes in the bacterial count after drying the hands were observed:

Another paper found that air dryers dispersed marker bacteria in a radius of three feet (one metre) and onto the investigator's laboratory coat.  Another study found that hot air dryers had the capacity to increase the bacterial count on the skin, and that paper towel drying decreased skin bacterial count.  This is corroborated by another study which found that the mechanical action of paper towel drying removed bacteria, something air dryers cannot do.

Doctors at the University of Ottawa claim that "the blowing of warm air may lead to an accelerated dehydration of the skin surface, thereby affecting the viability" of the microorganisms, and that the warm air may "penetrate all the crevices in the skin, whereas absorbent towels may not reach such areas, even though the skin appears dryer".

The European Tissue Symposium, a trade body, has produced a position statement on the hygiene standards of different hand drying systems. This summarises some of the scientific research undertaken.

Dyson (creators of the Dyson Airblade dryer) have countered the claims presented, suggesting that the results were intentionally falsified.

Noise
Many people object to the loud noise that hand dryers make. Typically, installed hand dryers make over 80 decibels of sound at a distance of  while in operation. It is much louder for the user and may exceed safety limits for children whose ears are at the height of the device.  Some units, however, are designed to be quieter at the cost of drying speed.

Reception 
Research conducted in 2008 indicated that European consumers much prefer hand towels over hand dryers in public washrooms. 63% of respondents said paper towels were their preferred drying method, while just 28% preferred a hand dryer. Respondents overwhelmingly considered paper towels to offer faster hand drying than electric hand dryers (68% vs 14%). On the whole they also considered paper towels to be the most hygienic form of hand drying in public washrooms (53% vs 44%).

See also
 Towel
 Paper towel

References

Public toilets
Personal hygiene products
forest conservation
water conservation
American inventions
20th-century inventions